The consensus 1957 College Basketball All-American team, as determined by aggregating the results of six major All-American teams.  To earn 'consensus' status, a player must win honors from a majority of the following teams: the Associated Press, the USBWA, The United Press International, the National Association of Basketball Coaches, the Newspaper Enterprise Association (NEA), and the International News Service.

1957 Consensus All-America team

Individual All-America teams

AP Honorable Mention:

 Harold Alcorn, Saint Louis
 Dick Banton, UCLA
 Larry Beck, Washington State
 Bruno Boin, Washington
 Bill Bond, Stanford
 Barney Cable, Bradley
 Vinnie Cohen, Syracuse
 Boo Ellis, Niagara
 Dick Gaines, Seton Hall
 Dave Gambee, Oregon State
 Joe Gibbon, Mississippi
 Johnny Green, Michigan State
 Vernon Hatton, Kentucky
 Don Hennon, Pittsburgh
 Johnny Lee, Yale
 Lee Marshall, Washington and Lee
 Don Medsker, Iowa State
 Mike Moran, Marquette
 Jack Murdock, Wake Forest
 Hank Nowak, Canisius
 Jack Parr, Kansas State
 Hub Reed, Oklahoma City
 Dave Ricketts, Duquesne
 Al Rochelle, Vanderbilt
 Lloyd Sharrar, West Virginia
 Doug Smart, Washington
 Win Wilfong, Memphis State

See also
 1956–57 NCAA University Division men's basketball season

References

NCAA Men's Basketball All-Americans
All-Americans